Alnwick is a civil parish in Northumberland County, New Brunswick, Canada.

For governance purposes it is divided between the village of Neguac, the Indian reserves of Esgenoôpetitj 14 and Tabusintac 9, the incorporated rural community of Alnwick, and the regional municipality of Tracadie. Neguac and Tracadie are members of the Acadian Peninsula Regional Service Commission, while Alnwick is a member of the Greater Miramichi RSC.

Prior to the 2023 governance reform, the rural community of Alnwick was divided between four local service districts: Fair Isle, Oak Point - Bartibog Bridge, Tabusintac, and the parish of Alnwick, which also included the islands that are now part of Neguac.

Origin of name
Alnwick and Newcastle Parishes were erected simultaneously. Alnwick and Newcastle are the county town and largest city of Northumberland County, England. This is probably the origin of the two parishes' names.

History
Alnwick was erected in 1786 as one of the original parishes of the county, with very different boundaries from today. The modern communities of Burnt Church and Bartibog were near or on the southern edge of the parish, which was nearly rectangular and ran west past the Nepisiguit River.

The 1814 reorganisation of Northumberland County's parishes gave Alnwick its modern shape, removing all territory in what's now Gloucester but adding modern Barryville, Oak Point, The Willows, Bartibog Bridge, and Winston.

Boundaries
Alnwick Parish is bounded:

 on the north by the Gloucester County line;
 on the east by the Gulf of Saint Lawrence;
 on the south by Miramichi Bay, Miramichi Inner Bay, and Miramichi River;
 on the west by a line beginning at the mouth of the Bartibog River, then running upriver to the Route 8 bridge, then north to the county line;
 including Sheldrake Island, Portage Island, and all islands in front.

Evolution of boundaries
The 1786 boundaries were a line running due west from the mouth of the Big Tracadie River in the north, a line running due west from the northern tip of Portage Island in the south, and in the west a line running north from the mouth of Cains River in what's now Blackville Parish. Alnwick included most of the modern parish along with parts of Allardville, Bathurst, Newcastle, Northesk, and Saumarez Parishes.

The 1814 reorganisation of Northumberland County's parishes gave Alnwick nearly its modern boundaries, removing all territory in what's now Gloucester County and Newcastle and Northesk Parishes but adding modern Barryville, Oak Point, The Willows, Bartibog Bridge, and Winston. The Newcastle line ran only six miles up the Bartibog River before going north to the county line, probably putting the departure point south of Sproule Road.

In 1850 the western boundary was moved upriver to its current departure point, transferring a strip of territory to Alnwick, most of it wilderness.

Communities
Communities at least partly within the parish. bold indicates an incorporated municipality, Indian reserve, or regional municipality

 Allainville
 Barryville
 B artibog Bridge
 Bayshore
 Breau Road
 Burnt Church
 Cains Point
 Covedell
 Drisdelle Settlement
 Esgenoôpetitj 14
 Fairisle
 Gaythorne
 Lagacéville
 Lauvergot
 Lavillette
 Neguac
 Comeau Settlement
 Lower Neguac
 Rivière-des-Caches
 New Jersey
 Oak Point
 Price Settlement
 Robichaud Settlement
 Saint-Wilfred
 Stymiest Road
 Tabusintac
 Tabusintac 9
 The Willows
 Regional Municipality of Tracadie
 Brantville
 Pontgravé
 Rivière-du-Portage
 Village-Saint-Laurent
 Winston
 Wishart Point

Bodies of water
Bodies of water at least partly in the parish.

 Bartibog River
 Big Eskedelloc River
 Burnt Church River
 Rivière des Caches
 Rivière du Portage
 Little Bartibog River
 Little Eskedelloc River
 Oyster River
 Tabusintac River
 Cowassaget Stream
 Grand Lac
 Gulf of St. Lawrence
 Gammon Bay
 Miramichi Bay
 Neguac Bay
 Tabusintac Bay
 Grand Dune Inlet
 Bass Fishing Channel
 Old Seal Gully
 Old Tabusintac Gully
 Ship Channel
 Tabusintac Gully

Islands
Islands at least partly in the parish.

 Brant Island
 Grand Dune Island
 Hay Island
 McLeods Island
 Old Dans Island
 Portage Island
 Redpine Island
 Sheep Island
 Sheldrake Island

Other notable areas
Parks, historic sites, and other noteworthy places at least partly in the parish.
 Brantville Protected Natural Area
 North Branch Burnt Church River Protected Natural Area
 South Branch Burnt Church River Protected Natural Area
 Tabusintac Lagoon and River Estuary
 Tabusintac Protected Natural Area
 Tabusintac River Protected Natural Area
 Tracadie Military Training Area

Demographics
Parish population total does not include Neguac, the Indian reserves or portion within the Regional Municipality of Tracadie. Revised census figures based on the 2023 local governance reforms have not been released.

Population
Population trend

Language
Mother tongue (2016)

See also
List of parishes in New Brunswick

Notes

References

External links
Alnwick Parish Standard Geographical Classification (SGC) 2001 from Statistics Canada
 Village of Neguac
 Tabusintac Local Service District
 Barryville-New Jersey

Parishes of Northumberland County, New Brunswick
Local service districts of Northumberland County, New Brunswick